Nina LaCour is an American author, primarily known for writing young adult literature with queer, romantic story lines. Her novel We Are Okay won the Printz Award in 2017.

Early life and education 
LaCour was born in 1983 in and raised in the San Francisco Bay area. Her family instilled in her an appreciation for the arts and education: "her grandmother taught china painting classes; her father was a teacher and then school principal; and her mother taught high school art."

She attended Campolindo High School and graduated in 2000. She received her bachelor's degree from San Francisco State University and a master of fine arts in creative writing from Mills College.

Career 
LaCour's first novel, Hold Still, was the result of her master's thesis while at Mills College. Also while there, LaCour began teaching English composition to undergraduate students. Following graduation, she taught at Berkeley City College and Maybeck High School before taking a few years off to care for her daughter.

At present, LaCour teaches in the Master of Fine Arts in Creative Writing for Children and Young Adults program at Hamline University.

Personal life 
LaCour currently lives in San Francisco with her wife and daughter.

Selected works

Hold Still (2009) 

Hold Still is a young adult novel published October 20, 2009 by Dutton Children's Books.

The book received the following accolades:

 American Library Association's Best Books for Young Adults selection (2010)
 William C. Morris Award finalist (2010)

Everything Leads to You (2014) 

Everything Leads to You is a young adult novel published May 15, 2014 Dutton Children's Books.

The book is a Junior Library Guild selection and has received the following accolades:

 Goodreads Choice Award for Young Adult Fiction nominee (2014)
 YALSA's Best Fiction for Young Adults (2015)
 ALA Rainbow List (2015)

We Are Okay (2017) 

We Are Okay is a young adult novel published February 14, 2017, by Dutton Children's Books.

TIME added the book to its "100 Best Young Adult Books of All Time" list, and Bustle named it one of the best books of the decade. The Boston Globe,Publishers Weekly, and Seventeen named it one of the best books of the year.

We Are Okay received various accolades, including the following:

 Booklist Editors' Choice: Books for Youth (2017)
 Michael L. Printz Award (2018)
 American Library Association's Rainbow List Top Ten (2018)

Watch Over Me (2020) 
Watch Over Me is a young adult novel published September 15, 2020, by Dutton Children's Books.

The New York Public Library, Chicago Public Library, Buzzfeed, and Kirkus named it one of the best young adult books of the year.

The book received various accolades, including the following:

 YALSA's Amazing Audiobooks for Young Adults selection (2021)
 YALSA's Best Fiction for Young Adults (2021)

Yerba Buena (2022) 
Yerba Buena is LaCour's first book of adult fiction. The novel has "themes of drug and sexual abuse, death, abandonment, and purposelessness" but is ultimately the story of "two star-crossed young women navigating trauma, family, and romance". The New York Times reviewed the book and called it a "sensory feast".

Publications 

 Hold Still (2009)
 The Disenchantments (2012)
 Everything Leads to You (2014)
 You Know Me Well, with David Levithan (2016)
 We Are Okay (2017)
 Watch Over Me (2020)
 Yerba Buena (2022)

References

External links 
 Official website

Living people
Year of birth missing (living people)
Writers from San Francisco
American LGBT writers
San Francisco State University alumni
Mills College alumni
Hamline University faculty